The Maritime Mobile Service Q Codes are art of a larger set of Q Codes designated by the ITU-R.  The QOA–QQZ code range is reserved for the Maritime Mobile Service.

This assignment is specified in RECOMMENDATION ITU-R M.1172.

Q signals are no longer substantially used in the maritime service. Morse code is now very rarely used for maritime communications, but in isolated maritime regions like Antarctica and the South Pacific the use of Q Codes continues. Q Codes still work when HF voice circuits are not possible due to atmospherics and the nearest vessel is one ionospheric hop away.

From ITU Radio Regulations 1990, Appendix 14: Miscellaneous Abbreviations and Signals to Be Used for Radiocommunications in the Maritime Mobile Service.

Amateur radio
Operating signals